Yagub Mammad oghlu Mammadov (5 May 1930 — 5 June 2002) was an Azerbaijani khananda, or mugham singer.

Biography 
Yagub Mammadov was born on 5 May 1930 in Aghjabadi District. In 1956 he came to Baku for the Republican Youth Festival and became a laureate of the festival. Then he was invited to the Azerbaijan State Philharmonic Hall. Yagub Mammadov had been working at the Philharmonic since 1958 and at the same time was studying in the class of Seyid Shushinski at the Asaf Zeynalli Music College. Yagub Mammadov was a soloist at the Azerbaijan State Philharmonic Hall for many years and performed at concerts. His mugham performances, recorded on gramophone shafts, have spread throughout the Middle East.

Mammadov died on 5 June 2002 in Baku.

Awards 
 People's Artists of the Azerbaijan SSR — 29 October 1990
 Honored Artist of the Azerbaijan SSR — 1 December 1982
 Shohrat Order — 3 December 2001

References 

1930 births
2002 deaths
20th-century Azerbaijani male singers
Azerbaijani educators
Mugham singers
People's Artists of the Azerbaijan SSR